Deng Xiaoping's dogs is a term used by modern Peruvian historiography to refer to a case of animal abuse perpetrated in Lima by Shining Path, a communist terror group, in response to Chinese leader Deng Xiaoping's unorthodox opening economic reform, distancing himself from the thoughts of Mao Zedong, founder of the People's Republic of China.

On the morning of December 26, 1980, several stray dogs were discovered by locals, hanging on lampposts located in important avenues of the city's central area. The dogs, hung by their necks, also had pieces of paper tied to them with phrases such as "Deng Xiaoping son of a bitch".

Background

Shining Path's relationship with Chinese communism 
The founder of Shining Path, Abimael Guzmán, was a fervent supporter of Mao Zedong, he even traveled twice to the fledgling People's Republic of China to learn about Maoism and see the development of the so-called Cultural Revolution. Guzmán himself considered the doctrine of his movement, Gonzalo Thought, as the fourth ideological line that would accompany Marxism-Leninism-Maoism.

After Mao's death, the new administration of Deng Xiaoping branded the result of Maoist policies as failures, although Deng was still a communist, he took opposite positions towards the classic policies in the country, in the face of the great Chinese famine and the power struggle. Guzmán took China's turnaround personally, blaming the Chinese reformer as a traitor to Mao, as a "capitalist road follower" and as a "dog."

Senderista preparations for Lima 
At the same time, the Shining Path was still not taken seriously by the Lima authorities, despite the fact that, according to the Center for Development Studies and Promotion (DESCO), by the end of 1980 it had already committed 219 terrorist attacks throughout the country.

Events 

The first dog seen was at six in the morning, after Christmas, at the intersection of Tacna and Nicolás de Piérola avenues, with a sign that warned of having a bomb in the animal's corpse. Members of the Civil Guard Emergency Squad removed the dead animal and found that the bomb threat was false. Squadron chief Armando Mellet reported that the animal had been beaten, strangled and also had a plastic tube forced into its mouth. Subsequently, another seven calls were recorded where they removed other hanging dogs, a total of one for each place.

For the police authorities those responsible were some unspecified communist group. Years later, Sendero Luminoso recognized his authorship. According to Carlos Tapia, a former member of the Truth and Reconciliation Commission, Abimael had given the order directly:That is why Abimael Guzmán ordered those dogs to be hanged. It was like a message that he wanted to give so that the world would know that in Peru there was a group of communists, Maoists, and above all followers of the Cultural Revolution who hated "Teng Siao Ping's dog."In addition, the chosen date, December 26, was also the date of Mao Zedong's birth. The killing of dogs in the framework of the internal armed conflict is the largest massacre against dogs that occurred in Peru. In total, Shining Path, according to journalist , killed more than 2 million animals "only in Junín, Ayacucho, Huancavelica and Puno" such as cattle, alpacas and sheep between the 1980s and 2000s.

See also 

 1987 North Korean embassy attack in Lima
 1986 Soviet embassy attack in Lima

References 

Shining Path
Animal killing
Terrorist incidents in South America in 1980
Dogs
Massacres in Peru
History of Lima

Internal conflict in Peru